Thomas Johnson, O.Cart., (died 20 September 1537) was a Carthusian hermit who was executed by starvation in Tudor England. He is venerated as a martyr and has been beatified by the Catholic Church.

Biography
Johnson and other members of the London Charterhouse had been arrested for refusing to sign the Oath of Supremacy. Like the others, after incarceration in Newgate Prison he was left to starve. Margaret Clement was temporarily able to bring him and the other Carthusians some food, by entering in disguise, but after King Henry VIII became suspicious from their continued survival, this was ended. Johnson took the longest to die of starvation, possibly because food had finally been allowed for him, in expectation that he would ultimately be executed instead.

A lay brother of the community named Horne survived and was not executed until 1540. In that year he was hanged, disembowelled, and quartered at Tyburn.

Thomas Johnson and the other Carthusian Martyrs were beatified by Pope Leo XIII in 1886.

There is a painting of Johnson in the church of the Certosa di Bologna.

See also
Carthusian Martyrs
Forty Martyrs of England and Wales

References

Year of birth missing
1537 deaths
English beatified people
Carthusian Martyrs of London
Carthusian saints
People executed by starvation
16th-century English Roman Catholic priests
16th-century venerated Christians
English people who died in prison custody
English Christian monks
People executed under the Tudors for treason against England
Martyred Roman Catholic priests
Executed English people
People executed under Henry VIII
Forty-one Martyrs of England and Wales